Franz Stiasny (1881–1941, in Poland) produced a large series of bronze portrait medals of important writers, musicians and historical personages in rectangular formats. Stiasny was best known for his portraits of famous composers. Various bronze medals were cast in Austria, c.1930.

The plaques measure mainly 54mm x 65mm and weigh 107gm.

Sources 
Biographical Dictionary of Medallists: Coin, Gem, and Seal-engravers, Mint-masters, &c., Ancient and Modern, with References to Their Works, B.C. 500-A.D. 1900, compiled by Leonard Forrer, B. Franklin (1970) 8 vols., vol. 5, pgs. 684-5.

1881 births
1941 deaths
19th-century engravers
20th-century engravers
Austrian medallists
Austrian engravers
Austrian designers
20th-century sculptors
19th-century sculptors